The Yellow Line (Line 2) of the Mumbai Metro is the second metro line in the city of Mumbai connecting Dahisar in the northwest with Mandale in Mankhurd via Andheri, BKC and Chembur in the east. Phase One of Line 2A was partially opened on 2 April 2022 from Dahisar East to Dahanukarwadi. On 19 January 2023, the whole line (2A) from Dahisar East to Andheri West (DN Nagar on Line 1) was operational for the public.

Construction on the first section of the line, called Metro 2A (between Dahisar and D.N. Road), began in November 2016, and was completed in April 2022. The new  section of the yellow line from Dahanukarwadi to DN Nagar was inaugurated on January 19, 2023, by Prime Minister Narendra Modi.

Planning

Public private partnership with RInfra 
In the updated master plan, the proposed Charkop–Bandra–Mankhurd and Charkop–Dahisar lines were merged into a single Dahisar–Bandra–Mankhurd line, which would have been  and had 27 stations. This was planned to be the second corridor of the Mumbai Metro. Like Line 1, this corridor was also proposed to be constructed on a public private partnership (PPP) model.

Then President Pratibha Patil launched the project in August 2009. The MMRDA appointed Reliance Infrastructure (RInfra), in consortium with SNC Lavolin Inc. Canada and Reliance Communication, through an international competitive bidding process to carry out this phase of the project, and the concession agreement was signed with the RInfra-led consortium in January 2010. The project was proposed to be implemented on build–operate–transfer (BOT) basis for a concession period of 35 years with an extension clause of another 10 years. The MMRDA estimated the project would cost , while Reliance Infrastructure estimated it would cost  11,000 crore. Construction was planned to begin in August 2010 and be completed by mid-2013. However, construction work had yet to begin by December 2012, leading to calls for Line 2 to be cancelled outright.

The line's construction was handicapped by the lack of available land for carsheds at Charkop and Mankhurd; Coastal Regulation Zone (CRZ) laws forbade construction on the land that had been selected by the MMRDA. The Union Ministry of Environment and Forests (MoEF) refused to give clearance for the depots. MMRDA officials plan to solve the problem by shifting the location of the proposed rake depot to Malwani near Malad. The  plot does not come under the purview of the CRZ laws and therefore will not require environmental clearances. The MMRDA has said that they have not ruled out an underground line, claiming that they had considered a combination of an elevated and underground alignment but had deemed it impossible due to the large land requirement for ramps and slip roads.

On 6 September 2012, the MMRDA sent a letter to Reliance Infrastructure asking them to start work on the metro immediately or face legal action. In response to the letter, RInfra blamed the government and MMRDA for the delayed construction work. They said that the government had failed to fulfill its contractual obligation to provide the necessary land, right of way permits and clearances. On 8 February 2013, then RInfra CEO Sumit Banerjee claimed that the project had not advanced because the MMRDA had failed to fulfill its share of the responsibilities. The state government had since been considering alternative sites for the depot, which might have led to complete change in the alignment of the line and could have required re-bidding for the project. On 9 August 2013, DNA reported that an MMRDA official had informed them that a  plot that was to be used as the casting yard for Line 2, was planned to be marked for use as a casting yard for Line 3. The paper called the move "a clear indication" that Line 2 "will not take off in the near future." Chief Minister Prithviraj Chavan told the media on 30 August 2013 that "it is now clear that Mumbai's Metro II project will now not happen."

On 13 November 2014, Reliance Infrastructure announced that it had terminated the agreement between the MMTPL and the Maharashtra government. RInfra stated, "Due to non-fulfilment of various critical obligations by Maharashtra government and Mumbai Metropolitan Region Development Authority (MMRDA), the project could not take off. Even after four years, despite the best efforts of the Maharashtra government, various project impediments could not be resolved." The MMRDA issued a statement confirming that the agreement was terminated with mutual consent. No party will bare any cost as a result of the termination and the state government will return a bank guarantee of  160 crore. The MMRDA also clarified that the Line 2 project had not been cancelled and will be constructed by the Mumbai Metro Railway Corp. Ltd (MMRCL) under an engineering, procurement and construction (EPC) model.

EPC model
In September 2013, the MMRDA appointed RITES to study the feasibility of constructing the proposed  metro line underground. RITES also studied the feasibility of extending the corridor and merging the  Charkop-Dahisar metro, proposed as a separate line, with this project. RITES submitted its final report to the MMRDA in the last week of May 2014, concluding that constructing the metro underground and extending it up to Dahisar was feasible. The estimated cost of construction of this line is  28,900 crore, 134% higher than the originally estimated costs of  7,660 crore for the Charkop-Bandra-Mankhurd line and  4,680 crore for the Charkop-Dahisar corridor. RITES proposed the construction of a major car depot at Oshiwara and a minor car depot at Mandalay, Mankhurd on sites that were a mix of publicly and privately held land. The extension of the line to Mankhurd would resolve the land acquisition issues as land was available for the construction of a depot at Mankhurd.

In June 2015, the MMRDA proposed a new line from BKC to Mankhurd. On 15 June 2015, the MMRDA announced that it would implement Line 2 of the metro in three parts - Dahisar East-DN Nagar (Metro 2A), DN Nagar-BKC (Metro 2B), and BKC-Mankhurd (Metro 2C), and also appointed the DMRC to conduct a feasibility study and detailed project report for the line. On 1 July 2015, it was announced that MMRDA was allotted a  plot in Mankhurd adjacent to the Sion Panvel highway for the Metro carshed. The land was under dispute between the MMRDA and the State Home Ministry for the construction of a Jail.

The plan was later modified to build the line in two sections - Dahisar-DN Nagar (Metro 2A) and DN Nagar-Mankhurd (Metro 2B). Metro 2A was approved by the Maharashtra Government on 6 October 2015. In November 2015, the Department of Economic Affairs (DEA) cleared the MMRDA's request to secure a loan from the Asian Development Bank (ADB).

The Maharashtra Cabinet approved the Metro 2B corridor on 27 September 2016. Half of the project cost will be funded by the Centre and the State Government, while the remaining will be financed through loans from the Asian Development Bank and New Development Bank. The project is estimated to cost  10,986 crore, including land acquisition cost of Rs 1,274 crore.

Construction
As per the government releases, Metro 2 will be built in two sections - Dahisar-DN Nagar (Metro 2A) and DN Nagar-Mankhurd (Metro 2B). The Maharashtra Government appointed the DMRC as a consultant to execute both sections. The DMRC will have sole responsibility for civil and technical works and O&M on the Metro 2A corridor. For the Metro 2B corridor, the MMRDA will carry out civil works, while the DMRC is tasked with technical work and O&M.

Metro 2A
This corridor has 16 stations - Dahisar East, Anand Nagar, Kandarpada, Mandapeshwar, Eksar, Borivali (West), Shimpoli, Kandivali (West), Dhanukarwadi, Valnai, Malad (West), Lower Malad, Pahadi Goregaon, Goregaon (West), Oshiwara, Lower Oshiwara and D.N. Nagar (Andheri West). Some of the station names are unfamiliar as these have been taken from the revenue records of the Government eg Lower Malad( Inorbit Mall ) and Pahadi Goregaon It has an interchange with Line 1 at DN Nagar and Line 7 at Dahisar. Line 2B will connect DN Nagar to Mankhurd via BKC. Line 2A is estimated to cost around ₹6,410 crores. The DMRC was appointed as the implementing agency for the project. The DMRC floated two tenders for the designing and construction of the corridor. The first package includes the design and construction of a viaduct and 8 elevated stations - Dahisar East, Anand Nagar (Dahisar), Kandarpada, IC Colony, Eksar, Borivali West, Pahadi Eksar, Mandapeshwar, Dahanukarwadi. The second package includes the remaining viaduct and 8 stations - Charkop, Malad, Kasturi Park (Malad), Bangur Nagar (Goregaon), Oshiwara, Samartha Nagar, Shastri Nagar and D.N. Nagar (Andheri West). JKumar Infra Pvt. Ltd was awarded both packages in June 2016, and carried out civil work, including viaducts and stations. The cost of the packages was estimated as  700 crores each, with JKumar Infra bidding below the reserve price.

Soil testing work along the corridor commenced in July 2016. Construction on the corridor began in November 2016. As of 13 September 2017, 77% of the soil investigation work for pier foundation is completed, 	76% of barricading work is completed, 37% piles completed, 
19% pile caps completed, 110 piers are cast, 75 pier caps erected, 26 U girders erected and work pile foundation work commenced for all 17 stations. The corridor was scheduled to be commissioned in 2019, but delays in procuring rolling stock will push the deadline to 2020.

In April 2019, the MMRDA issued tenders for the rooftop solar PV power projects at stations on Metro 2A.

Trial runs on section of 2A from Dhanukarwadi to Dahisar East has started from 31 May 2021.

Metro 2A yellow line has been opened to the public in two phases: upto Dhanukarwadi station in the first phase and up to DN Nagar in the second phase. First phase commercial operations began on 3 April 2022 (along with the first phase of Metro Line 7), and the second phase was opened on 19 January 2023 by Prime Minister Narendra Modi .

Metro 2B
The foundation stone for the Metro 2B was laid by Prime Minister Narendra Modi on 24 December 2016. The MMRDA invited bids for civil work on Metro 2B on 4 January 2017. Metro 2B was divided into four packages - ESIC Nagar to Khira Nagar, Saraswat Nagar to ILFS, MTNL Metro to Chembur, and Diamond Garden to Mandale. Metro 2B was tendered alongside Metro 4. L&T, Afcons Infrastructure, Tata, NCC and JMC, Reliance Infrastructure-RdE, JKumar Group, ITD Cementation, CHEC-TPL bid for packages on both Metro 2B and Metro 4. Simplex Infrastructures and a consortium of GHEC-RCC-JV-China placed bids only for some packages of Metro 2B. A total of 10 firms and/or consortia submitted bids for the two lines.

The MMRDA utilized a drone to carry out survey work for Metro 2B. The drones were fitted with a 360-degree camera that provides up to 3 millimeter accuracy. The aerial survey takes less time than a regular survey, achieves greater accuracy and helps protect against false claims for compensation.

Construction began in April 2018. MMRDA has awarded contract of construction of viaduct and stations for package 1 to simplex. This package includes section between DN nagar to BKC.
As of 2020, the contracts of Simplex & RCC-MBZ is terminated and new contracts have been given to Jkumar and NCC.

Current Status

Metro 2A

Metro 2B

Stations

There will be a total of 37 stations on the Dahisar - Mandala route. Metro 2A, from Dahisar to DN Nagar, will have 17 stations, and Metro 2B, from DN Nagar to Mankhurd, will have 20 stations.

Yellow Line 2A

Yellow Line 2B

The construction of Metro-2B has courted controversy after some filmstars and residents from Bandra, Khar and Juhu challenged the construction of Metro-2B being elevated instead of underground. The residents have been claiming elevated Metro corridor will ruin already narrow SV Road, and underground metro corridor would be an ideal for their area. Originally, the metro line was supposed to go straight from Juhu Circle on NS road 10 and take a left from Pushpa Narsee Park junction onto V. Mehta Road. However due to protests from some residents, the route was changed and now it will take left from JVPD Circle and will continue on Gulmohar Road till Mithibhai college and will take a left turn to join V.Mehta Road. The new plan also includes a flyover for vehicles running parallel and under the metro viaducts to connect Andheri East with Versova.

In 2020 June, MMRDA terminated Simplex and RCC-MBZ contracts over slow work and new tenders were floated in August 2020.
Since 2019 November, work on 2b from ESIC Nagar to Chembur package has stopped completely.

As of March 2021, Jkumar & NCC have been given contracts to finish pending viaduct and station works.

2 metro stations which are MMRDA and Kurla Terminus were formerly in this route have been cancelled.
MMRDA Station was cancelled because it was in the way of Kalanagar Flyover.
Kurla Terminus Station was cancelled because of lack of space to construct it and its very close proximity to a previous station.

Construction & System Contracts

Cost
Metro 2A is estimated to cost . The State Government will bear 48% of the total project cost. The MMRDA secured a loan worth 52% of the total project cost from the Asian Development Bank (ADB). Metro 2B is estimated to cost  10,986 crore, including land acquisition cost of Rs 1,274 crore. Half of the project cost will be funded by the Centre and the State Government, while the remaining will be financed through loans from the Asian Development Bank and the World Bank.

The MMRDA allotted  to the DMRC to implement and commission rolling stock, signalling and telecommunication work for the Metro 2A and Metro 7 corridors on 26 November 2016.

On 2 March 2019, the Union Ministry of Finance stated that it signed a $926 million loan agreement with the ADB to fund construction of Metro 2 and 7. This was the single largest infrastructure loan ever extended by the ADB. The funds will be used to procure 63 six-car trainsets and for signalling and safety systems on both corridors.

Infrastructure

Fare collection
A consortium of Indian company Datamatics and Italian company AEP Ticketing solutions S.R.L was awarded a  contract to implement the automated fare collection system for Metro 2 and Metro 7 in February 2019.

References

Mumbai Metro lines